Rinaldo Rinaldini is a 1927 German silent adventure film directed by Max Obal and Rudolf Dworsky and starring Luciano Albertini, Olga Engl, and Grit Haid. The film is an Italian-set swashbuckler, based on Christian August Vulpius's 1797 novel Rinaldo Rinaldini, the Robber Captain. Filming took place at the Staaken Studios in Berlin.

Cast

References

Bibliography

External links 
 

1927 films
Films of the Weimar Republic
German adventure films
German silent feature films
1927 adventure films
Films directed by Rudolf Dworsky
Films directed by Max Obal
Films set in Italy
Films based on German novels
German black-and-white films
Silent adventure films
1920s German films
Films shot at Staaken Studios